Kund Malir is a beach in Balochistan, Pakistan located in Hingol National Park, about  from Zero-Point on Makran Coastal Highway. Hingol National Park is the largest national park in Pakistan. The drive between Kund Malir and Ormara is known for being scenic, and traverses a rural part of the country.

After passing Zero-Point, there are no food or fuel facilities available on the route. Kund Malir is considered to be one of the most beautiful beaches in this world. Due to increase in tourism, some of the mobile networks, including Ufone,have established service to provide coverage in this rural region. Several tour companies have expanded their services to help people access and explore this beautiful region. Kund Malir is a popular weekend picnic and daytrip destination for people from Karachi and interior Sindh. The location is unique and has panoramic views of mountains, sea and desert.

Gallery

See also 
List of beaches in Pakistan

References 

Beaches of Pakistan
Landforms of Balochistan (Pakistan)